Erigeron alpicola is an Asian species of flowering plants in the family Asteraceae. It is native to Japan, to Jilin Province in China, and to the Kamchatka Peninsula in Russia.

Erigeron alpicola is a perennial, clump-forming herb up to 28 cm (11.2 inches) tall. Its flower heads have lilac ray florets and yellow disc florets.

References

alpicola
Flora of Japan
Flora of the Russian Far East
Flora of Manchuria
Plants described in 1906